Edward Kowalski (1915–1998) was an American professor of medicine specializing in gynecology and obstetrics. He published 103 publications in medical journals, as well as three books.

External links
PubMed - Professor Edward Kowalski

1915 births
1998 deaths
American gynecologists